Somethin' Sanctified is an album by American jazz trombonist, composer and arranger Slide Hampton which was released on the Atlantic label in 1961.

Reception

Allmusic gave the album 3 stars.

Track listing 
 "On the Street Where You Live" (Frederick Loewe, Alan Jay Lerner) - 2:55
 "The Thrill Is Gone" (Ray Henderson, Lew Brown) - 3:00
 "Ow" (Dizzy Gillespie) - 2:08
 "Milestones" (Miles Davis) - 2:33
 "El Sino" (Charles Greenlea) - 4:37
 "Somethin' Sanctified" (Slide Hampton) - 2:52

Personnel 
Slide Hampton - trombone, baritone horn, arranger
Hobart Dotson, Richard Williams - trumpet
Charles Greenlee - trombone, baritone horn
Jay Cameron - baritone saxophone, bass clarinet
George Coleman - tenor saxophone
Larry Ridley - bass
Pete La Roca - drums

References 

Slide Hampton albums
1961 albums
Atlantic Records albums